Brennpunkt (English: "Focal Point") is a Norwegian investigative documentary series that has aired on NRK1 since 1996, except for a hiatus in 2007. The series was originally hosted by Håkon Haugsbø, and from 2014 by Jeanette Platou.

The documentaries have won several Gullruten awards, as well as a Prix Italia award and a Daniel Pearl Award for Outstanding International Investigative Journalism (in cooperation with journalists from BBC's Newsnight, The Guardian and de Volkskrant, for exposing activities of the Trafigura company).

References

External links
 Official website

1996 Norwegian television series debuts
Norwegian documentary television series
NRK original programming
1990s Norwegian television series
2000s Norwegian television series
2010s Norwegian television series